Agave deserti (desert agave, mescal, century plant or maguey) is an agave native to desert regions in southern California, Arizona, and Baja California. Its tall yellow flower stalks dot dry rocky slopes and washes throughout the spring.

It forms a rosette of fleshy gray-green leaves 20–70 cm long and 4.5–10 cm broad, with sharp spines along the edges and at the tips. It flowers at maturity (20 to 40 years), sending up an inflorescence 2–6 m tall. The panicle bears numerous yellow, funnel-shaped flowers 3–6 cm long.

There are two varieties:
Agave deserti var. deserti. Plants usually with numerous rosettes; perianth tube 3–5 mm. Southern California only.
Agave deserti var. simplex (Gentry) W.C.Hodgson & Reveal. Plants usually with one or only a few rosettes; perianth tube 5–10 mm. Southern California and Arizona.

Cultivation and uses
The desert agave is drought-tolerant but requires good drainage.

The desert dwelling Native Americans used fibers from the leaves to make cloth, bowstrings, and rope. Young flower stalks (roasted), buds, and hearts of plants (also roasted) were eaten. Natives of southern California commonly harvested the "heads" using a specialized digging stick and roasted the leaves and heart alike. Food thus obtained often became a dietary staple, even into drought years.

Alcoholic drinks were also manufactured from the sweet juices of this and other agaves.

References

Sources

 Flora of North America: Agave deserti
 C.Michael Hogan ed. 2010. “Agave deserti”. Encyclopedia of Life
 Jepson Flora Project: Agave deserti
 Dole, Jim W. and Rose, Betty B., Shrubs and Trees of the Southern California Deserts, 1996, Foot-Loose Press.

deserti
Flora of Arizona
Flora of Baja California
Flora of the California desert regions
North American desert flora
Plants described in 1875